Sheikh Muhammad Ali Ja'abari ( 1900–1980) was the long-serving mayor of the Palestinian city of Hebron, appointed by Jordan, from 1948 to 1976. Ja'abari was head of the Jericho Conference in Jericho which supported the unification of the West Bank and Jordan. In the 1950s, he held a seat in the upper chamber of the Jordanian government.

Career
After Israel occupied the West Bank from Jordan in the 1967 Six-Day War, he proposed that Israel only remain in power for five years after which the Palestinians would reserve the right of self-determination. Apparently, it had been agreed with Israel that he would serve as the Prime Minister of a new Palestinian state. He prominently opposed the violent nature of the fedayeen. Throughout the 1970s, he was member of various Jordanian cabinets.

Ja'abari died in 1980. He is related to Sulaiman Ja'abari, the former Grand Mufti of Jerusalem.

References 

1900 births
1980 deaths
People from Hebron
Members of the Senate of Jordan
Mayors of Hebron
Mayors of places in Jordan